This is a list of women artists who were born in Afghanistan or whose artworks are closely associated with that country.

A 
 Lida Abdul (born 1973), Afghan-born American video artist and performance artist
 Rada Akbar (born 1988), Afghan-born visual artist and photographer, living in exile

G 
 Mariam Ghani (born 1978), American visual artist, photographer, filmmaker and social activist of Afghan descent

H 
 Shamsia Hassani (born 1988), graffiti artist and professor

K 
 Samira Kitman (born 1984), calligrapher and miniaturist, resides in England

S 
 Malina Suliman (born 1990), graffiti artist, metalworker, and painter

T 
 Safia Tarzi, fashion designer

W 
 Farzana Wahidy (born 1984), photographer

See also 
 List of Afghans
 List of Afghan artists

-
Afghan
Artists
Artists, women